The Hypo-Meeting is an annual athletics competition that takes place in the Mösle stadium in Götzis in Vorarlberg (Austria) held in the spring (late May, early June). In its history, a total of three world records have been set: 1980 and 1982 by Daley Thompson (8648 and 8730 points), and 2001 by Roman Šebrle (9026 points). 

Organised by the International Association of Athletics Federations (IAAF), it is one of the athletics meetings that make up the IAAF Combined Events Challenge. Male and female athletes compete in the decathlon or heptathlon, respectively, and points scored at the Hypo-Meeting count towards a yearly total for the parent competition.

History 
In 1972, the Montfort community for athletics (Leichtathletikgemeinschaft Montfort) was founded in Götzis, Vorarlberg. A year later, the community offered to hold the Austrian Multi-Discipline Championship which they ultimately did in 1975, superseding the traditional multi-discipline event in Schielleiten. The first Hypo-Meeting began as a men's only contest in 1975 and a women's competition was added in 1981.

The meeting has been sponsored by the Hypo Vorarlberg Bank AG for over 30 years now, hence its name.

Competition format
Following the setup of virtually all major combined events competitions, the events programme is split over two days.

Records

Winners

References

External links

 
Decathlon
Annual track and field meetings
Recurring sporting events established in 1975
International athletics competitions hosted by Austria
World Athletics Combined Events Tour
1975 establishments in Austria